
This is a list of the 31 players who earned their 2010 European Tour card through Q School in 2009.

 2010 European Tour rookie

2010 Results

* European Tour rookie in 2010
T = Tied 
 The player retained his European Tour card for 2011 (finished inside the top 117).
 The player did not retain his European Tour Tour card for 2011, but retained conditional status (finished between 118-150).
 The player did not retain his European Tour card for 2011 (finished outside the top 150).

Ohlsson, Johansen, and Coetzee regained their cards for 2011 through Q School, while Gagli regained his by finishing 17th in the Challenge Tour rankings.

Winners on the European Tour in 2010

Runners-up on the European Tour in 2010

See also
2009 Challenge Tour graduates
2010 European Tour

References
Final Results
Player biographies and records

European Tour
European Tour Qualifying School Graduates